The Codfish Musket is a children's historical novel by Agnes Hewes. Set in the early nineteenth century, the action ranges from Boston and Washington to the western frontier in a tale of gun theft and trading. The novel, illustrated by Armstrong Sperry was first published in 1936 and was a Newbery Honor recipient in 1937.

References

1936 American novels
Children's historical novels
American children's novels
Newbery Honor-winning works
Novels set in the United States
Novels set in the 19th century
1936 children's books